is a Japanese athlete. He competed in the men's long jump at the 1960 Summer Olympics.

References

1939 births
Living people
Athletes (track and field) at the 1960 Summer Olympics
Japanese male long jumpers
Olympic athletes of Japan
Place of birth missing (living people)